Albert Oldfield Brown (December 30, 1872 – March 5, 1945), sometime known as A. O. Brown, was an actor and the president of The Lambs from 1921 to 1924 and again from 1930 to 1932. He was president of the Percy Williams Home for Retired Actors and Actresses.

Biography
He was born on December 30, 1872, in Manhattan, New York City. He married May Arents in 1891.

His first job was as a clerk at the Real Estate Trust Company. He then worked as a cashier at the American Tobacco Company. In 1902 he formed the A. O. Brown brokerage firm but he went bankrupt in the Panic of 1907.

In November 1908 he married Edna Wallace Hopper.

He died on March 5, 1945, at Columbia-Presbyterian Hospital in Manhattan, New York City.

References

The Lambs presidents
1872 births
1945 deaths
People from Manhattan